Sphenopteris is a genus of seed ferns containing the foliage of various extinct plants, ranging from the Devonian to Late Cretaceous. One species, S. höninghausi, was transferred to the genus Crossotheca in 1911.

Biology 

Distribution 
In Brazil, fossil of form genus Sphenopteris was located in outcrop Morro Papalé in the city of Mariana Pimentel. They are in the geopark Paleorrota in Rio Bonito Formation and date from Sakmarian in Permian. Fossils of Sphenopteris have also been found in the Valle Alto Formation, Caldas, Colombia, among many other locations.

References

External links 
Jardin Botanico de Córdoba: Species tables

Pteridospermatophyta
Prehistoric plant genera
Devonian plants
Carboniferous plants
Mississippian plants
Pennsylvanian plants
Permian plants
Triassic plants
Jurassic plants
Early Cretaceous plants
Late Devonian first appearances
Cretaceous extinctions
Prehistoric plants of South America
Fossils of Brazil
Fossils of Colombia
Jurassic Colombia
Fossil taxa described in 1825
Fossils of Georgia (U.S. state)
Late Cretaceous plants
Paleozoic life of New Brunswick
Paleozoic life of Newfoundland and Labrador
Paleozoic life of Nova Scotia
Paleozoic life of Nunavut